Carlos Eduardo Rocha (born July 12, 1984), also known as Carlos Eduardo Rocha, is a Brazilian mixed martial artist.

Early life
Born an orphan in Cabedelo, Brazil he worked as a dish washer, often sleeping outside, on the street, and on beaches. He started training in martial arts at the age of six and eventually he saved enough money to move to Fortaleza, Ceara, Brazil.

In Fortaleza, he was taken in by Dárcio Lira, from whom he learned Brazilian jiu-jitsu and earned his black belt. He claims to have won around 50 regional tournaments in Brazil and Germany between 1996 and 2008 before turning to professional mixed martial arts. Before turning pro, he worked as a Jiu-Jitsu instructor and bouncer.

He got his nickname "Tá Danado" (or "The Spaz") because of the herky-jerky way he moved around on the mat when working his jiu-jitsu. His coach would tell him 'Hey kid, stop being so agitated (danado), stay calm.' when he grappled. The term is meant to liken him to the cartoon character Taz.

Mixed martial arts career
In 2008 he traveled to Dresden as a cornerman of German MMA pioneer Andre Balschmieter for an 8-man tournament. When Balschmieter had to pull out due to injury Rocha elected to take his place. Because of numerous injuries, the tournament was dropped to four fighters, and after a quick submission victory over Johannes Kunz, Rocha found himself competing for the Free Fight Alliance (FFA) middleweight title in only his second professional fight. Rocha won the fight by submission, over the far more experienced Steve Mensing, to become FFA Middleweight Champion and was quickly pegged as a rising star in the German MMA circuit. He went on to gain La Onda's Manto Cup in an 8-man, one-night tournament in 2009 and was signed by the UFC soon afterward.

Ultimate Fighting Championship
Rocha made his official UFC debut November 13, 2010, at UFC 122: Marquardt vs. Okami. To motivate him, Rocha's manager told him he only had a one-fight contract, and he would need to win to stay in the UFC. He fought TUF 11 runner-up Kris McCray defeating him by kneebar at 2:21 of round 1.

Rocha's next fight came only two months later, on February 5, 2011 at UFC 126: Silva vs. Belfort against Jake Ellenberger. Rocha was a replacement for Jon Fitch after Fitch was moved to the UFC 127 main event to fight B.J. Penn. Rocha lost the fight via controversial split decision. The dissenting judge scoring the bout for Rocha drew the ire of commentator Joe Rogan and other members of the press, who cited the 30-27 scoring as "questionable".

After his fight with Ellenberger, Rocha hoped to compete at UFC 134 in Rio pending the results of shoulder and elbow surgery. However, further X-rays showed severe damage in both his right and left elbows, leaving him unable to compete for the rest of 2011. He had hoped to return some time in early 2012, but was unable to schedule a fight. After recovering from surgery he moved to the US and started training with team Black House in Los Angeles, California.

Rocha next faced Mike Pierce on June 8, 2012 at UFC on FX 3. As well as moving to Black House to train for the fight, Rocha claimed that this was the first time in his career that he had a full training camp leading up to a fight.  Originally 2 judges scored the fight 30-27 for Pierce, while the 3rd judge inexplicably scored it 30-27 for Rocha. However, it was later announced that the judge, Ric Bays, had scored the fight for the wrong corner and that Pierce had actually won unanimously.

Rocha was released from his UFC contract following his loss to Pierce. After his release Rocha was publicly critical of Pierce for his lack of aggression in the fight, and perceived unwillingness to engage with Rocha. He was also critical of the UFC for releasing him, saying "I had good performances and even so I was cut off. I didn’t expect this.”

Championships and achievements

Grappling
CBJJO Copa Del Mundo
 −77 kg Blue Belt: 1st Place
 −77 kg Purple Belt: 1st Place & Purple Belt Absolute: 1st Place
Submissao
2009 Submission Wrestling Finalist

Mixed Martial Arts
Free Fight Alliance
FFA European Middleweight Champion (1 time)

La Onda
Manto Cup Champion Winner

Mixed martial arts record

|-
| Loss
|align=center| 9–4
| James Terry
| TKO (punches)
| Bellator 142: Dynamite 1
| 
|align=center| 1
|align=center| 4:00
|  San Jose, California United States
| 
|-
| Loss
|align=center| 9–3
| Florent Betorangal
| TKO (punches)
| GMC 4: Next Level
| 
|align=center| 3
|align=center| 1:28
| Gysenberghalle, Herne, Germany
| 
|-
| Loss
|align=center| 9–2
| Mike Pierce
| Decision (unanimous)
| UFC on FX: Johnson vs. McCall
| 
|align=center| 3
|align=center| 5:00
| Sunrise, Florida, United States
| 
|-
| Loss
|align=center| 9–1
| Jake Ellenberger
| Decision (split)
| UFC 126
| 
|align=center| 3
|align=center| 5:00
| Las Vegas, Nevada, United States
| 
|-
| Win
|align=center| 9–0
| Kris McCray
| Submission (kneebar)
| UFC 122
| 
|align=center| 1
|align=center| 2:21
| Oberhausen, Germany
| 
|-
| Win
|align=center| 8–0
| Fatih Balci
| Submission (arm-triangle choke)
| GMC 1: The Beginning
| 
|align=center| 1
|align=center| 3:58
| Herne, Germany
| 
|-
| Win
|align=center| 7–0
| Artur Kadlubek
| TKO (corner stoppage)
| La Onda: Manto Cup
| 
|align=center| 1
|align=center| 5:00
| Magdeburg, Germany
| Won Manto Cup
|-
| Win
|align=center| 6–0
| Mihajlo Mihnjak
| Submission (arm-triangle choke)
| La Onda: Manto Cup
| 
|align=center| 1
|align=center| 1:04
| Magdeburg, Germany
| 
|-
| Win
|align=center| 5–0
| David Goldberg
| Submission (armbar)
| La Onda: Manto Cup
| 
|align=center| 1
|align=center| 1:57
| Magdeburg, Germany
| 
|-
| Win
|align=center| 4–0
| Yasin Mengulluoglu
| Submission (heel hook)
| 8ME: Night of Bang 5
| 
|align=center| 2
|align=center| 2:35
| Halle, Germany
| 
|-
| Win
|align=center| 3–0
| Jimmy Sidoni
| Submission (armbar)
| La Onda: It's Showtime
| 
|align=center| 1
|align=center| 1:40
| Magdeburg, Germany
| 
|-
| Win
|align=center| 2–0
| Steve Mensing
| Submission (leglock)
| FFA: East German Championships 2008
| 
|align=center| 1
|align=center| 1:20
| Erfurt, Germany
| Won FFA European middleweight title
|-
| Win
|align=center| 1–0
| Johannes Kunze
| Submission (rear-naked choke)
| FFA: European Championships
| 
|align=center| 1
|align=center| 2:18
| Dresden, Germany
|
|-
|}

Submission grappling record
{| class="wikitable sortable" style="font-size:80%; text-align:left;"
|-
| colspan=8 style="text-align:center;" | 0 Wins (0 Submissions), 1 Losses (1 Submissions), 0 Draws
|-
!  Result
!  style="text-align:center;"| Rec.
!  Opponent
!  Method
!  Event
!  Division
!  Date
!  Location
|-
|Loss
|style="text-align:center;"|0–1
| Benji Silva
| Submission (kneebar)
|Fight 2 Win 98
|Superfight
|January 19, 2019
| San Jose, California

References

External links
Official UFC Profile

Brazilian emigrants to Germany
Brazilian male mixed martial artists
Welterweight mixed martial artists
Mixed martial artists utilizing Brazilian jiu-jitsu
Living people
1981 births
Ultimate Fighting Championship male fighters
Brazilian practitioners of Brazilian jiu-jitsu
People awarded a black belt in Brazilian jiu-jitsu
Submission grapplers